CyberLink MediaShow is a software application for organizing, editing and sharing photos and videos, published by CyberLink Corporation. MediaShow allows users to import video and photo files from digital cameras, phones, and camcorders.  Its main competitors are Arcsoft MediaImpression, Adobe Bridge, Roxio Creator and Google Picasa. The program also resembles, but does not directly compete with Apple iPhoto. MediaShow software can be purchased online or in popular computer retail stores.

Version History
MediaShow version 3 allowed for the creation of photo slideshows and the option to edit photos using auto-fixes or manually.

MediaShow version 4 introduced a number of significant updates. New features included video editing tools with auto-fixes that enhanced video lighting and steadied shaky video content. Photo management with tagging features makes searching for files easier than in previous versions and in addition there is an option to upload photos to Flickr or videos to YouTube, all directly from the program’s interface.

Version 5 featured the addition of face detection and face recognition technology, video conversion, and the option to upload photos to Facebook.

The latest, version 6 features the addition of calendar and instant views, and is optimized for touchscreen interfaces.

References

External links
CyberLink MediaShow (DVD converter)
Free download CyberLink MediaShow

Photo software
Image organizers
Windows multimedia software
Image-sharing websites